Dysstroma ochrofuscaria is a moth in the family Geometridae described by Douglas C. Ferguson in 1983. It is found in North America.

The MONA or Hodges number for Dysstroma ochrofuscaria is 7186.

Notes
 Dysstroma ochrofuscaria was originally published as an unavailable infrasubspecific name 'Dysstroma mulleolata, ab. ochrofuscaria, nov.' in Swett, 1917. Hodges et al. (1983) was the first to publish it as a species name.

References

Further reading
 
 Hodges, R. W., et al., eds. (1983). Check List of the Lepidoptera of America North of Mexico: Including Greenland, 284.
 Poole, Robert W. / Poole, Robert W., and Patricia Gentili, eds. (1996). Lepidoptera. Nomina Insecta Nearctica: A Check List of the Insects of North America, vol. 3: Diptera, Lepidoptera, Siphonaptera, 605–1122.
 Scoble, Malcolm J., ed. (1999). Geometrid Moths of the World: A Catalogue (Lepidoptera, Geometridae), 1016.

External links
Butterflies and Moths of North America

Geometridae